Pamola (also known as Pamolai, P-mol-a, Pomola, and Bmola) is a legendary bird spirit that appears in Abenaki mythology. This spirit causes cold weather.

Specifically, according to the Penobscot tribal nation, Pamola inhabited Katahdin, the tallest mountain in Maine. Pamola is said to be the thunder god and protector of the mountain.  The Penobscot people describe him as having the head of a moose, the body of a man and the wings and feet of an eagle. Pamola was both feared and respected by the Penobscot nation, and his presence was one of the main reasons that climbing the mountain was considered taboo.

The spirit resented mortals intruding from down below. Because of this, the mountain was closed off limits to all below. Henry David Thoreau, of his August, 1846 exploration of the Penobscot River and Katahdin wrote, "Pomola is always angry with those who climb to the summit of Ktaadn."

It was also widely believed that Pamola had took and held prisoners on his mountain forever.

The name is now preserved on Pamola Peak, a summit on Katahdin at the eastern edge of the Knife Edge ridge.  The Pamola Lodge of the Order of the Arrow is an honor camping society of the Boy Scouts of America; Pamola's image is commonly used on several of the society's insignia.

Roy Dudley, probably the most notable of the early guides on Katahdin, was known for his campfire yarns about Pamola.

References

Further reading
 Chimney Pond Tales (1991), Pamola Press, 

Pre-statehood history of Maine
Abenaki legendary creatures
Legendary birds
Mountain gods
Thunder gods
Avian humanoids